Lebeau (also spelled LeBeau and originally known as Bayou Petite Prairie) is an unincorporated community in St. Landry Parish, Louisiana, United States, in the central part of the state. Nearby communities include Palmetto, Ville Platte and Washington. The community is part of the Opelousas–Eunice Micropolitan Statistical Area.

Name 
The town was named after Fr Pierre Oscar Lebeau, SSJ, a Catholic priest with the Josephites who helped settle the town.The parish he founded, Immaculate Conception Catholic Church, still operates there.

Agriculture 

 Soybeans
 Corn

Education 
North Central High School (Hurricanes) - Grades 5–12.

Events 
Lebeau Zydeco Festival – an annual festival featuring performances from leading zydeco artists. As of 2018, the festival is hosting its 28th annual celebration. The festival is usually held on the first Saturday in July on the Immaculate Conception Catholic Church grounds.

Notable people 
 Fr PIerre Oscar Lebeau, SSJ – The town's founder and first pastor of Immaculate Conception.
Sidney Simien (Rockin' Sidney) – Internationally famed Zydeco musician, known for his hit single "My Toot Toot" stayed on The Country Top 40 for 18 weeks, Certified Platinum and won a Grammy award.

References

Unincorporated communities in St. Landry Parish, Louisiana